Happy Camp may refer to:

Geography
Happy Camp, California, a census-designated place in Siskiyou County, California, United States
John Newbold Camp, also known as "Happy Camp"
Fish Camp, California, formerly known as "Happy Camp"

Entertainment
Happy Camp (variety show), a popular Chinese television show
Happy Camp (film), a 2014 found footage film

See also
Happy Campers (disambiguation)